The shifting nth root algorithm is an algorithm for extracting the nth root of a positive real number which proceeds iteratively by shifting in n digits of the radicand, starting with the most significant, and produces one digit of the root on each iteration, in a manner similar to long division.

Algorithm

Notation

Let B be the base of the number system you are using, and n be the degree of the root to be extracted. Let  be the radicand processed thus far,  be the root extracted thus far, and  be the remainder. Let  be the next  digits of the radicand, and  be the next digit of the root. These are all integers.

Invariants
At each iteration, the invariant  will hold. The invariant  will hold.

Initialization
An aligned block of  digits means a block of digits aligned so that the decimal point falls between blocks. For example, in 123.4 the most significant aligned block of two digits is 01, the next most significant is 23, and the third most significant is 40.

Main loop
On each iteration we shift in  digits of the radicand, so we have  and we produce one digit of the root, so we have . The first invariant implies that . We want to choose  so that the invariants described above hold. It turns out that there is always exactly one such choice, as will be proved below.

To summarize, on each iteration:
 Let  be the next aligned block of digits from the radicand
 Let 
 Let  be the largest  such that 
 Let 
 Let 

Now, note that , so the condition

is equivalent to

and

is equivalent to

Summary
 Repeat until desired precision is obtained:
 Let  be the next aligned block of digits from the radicand.
 Let  be the largest  such that 
 Let .
 Let 
 Assign  and 

Paper-and-pencil nth roots
As noted above, this algorithm is similar to long division, and it lends itself to the same notation:

      .              
     ——————————————————————
 _ / 3.    
  \/                          = (10×)2×     +(10×)×2     +3
      —
      2 
      1 744                    = (10×)2×     +(10×)×2     +3
      —————
        256 
        241 984                = (10×)2×    +(10×)×2    +3
        ———————
         14 016 
         12 458 888            = (10×)2×   +(10×)×2   +3
         ——————————
          1 557 112 
          1 247 791 448        = (10×)2×  +(10×)×2  +3
          —————————————
            309 320 552 
            249 599 823 424    = (10×)2× +(10×)×2 +3
            ———————————————
             59 720 728 576

Note that after the first iteration or two the leading term dominates the

Performance
On each iteration, the most time-consuming task is to select . We know that there are  possible values, so we can find  using  comparisons. Each comparison will require evaluating . Assuming -digit multiplication takes time  and addition takes time , we take time
 for each comparison, or time  to pick .  The remainder of the algorithm is addition and subtraction that takes time , so each iteration takes .  For all  digits, we need time .

That this algorithm does not have bounded memory usage puts an upper bound on the number of digits which can be computed mentally, unlike the more elementary algorithms of arithmetic. Unfortunately, any bounded memory state machine with periodic inputs can only produce periodic outputs, so there are no such algorithms which can compute irrational numbers from rational ones, and thus no bounded memory root extraction algorithms.

When the base is larger than the radicand, the algorithm degenerates to binary search, so it follows that this algorithm is not useful for computing roots with a computer, as it is always outperformed by much simpler binary search, and has the same memory complexity.

Examples

Square root of 2 in binary

       1. 0  1  1  0  1
     ------------------
 _  / 10.00 00 00 00 00     1
  \/   1                  + 1
      -----               ----
       1 00                100
          0               +  0
      --------            -----
       1 00 00             1001
         10 01            +   1
      -----------         ------
          1 11 00          10101
          1 01 01         +    1
          ----------      -------
             1 11 00       101100
                   0      +     0
             ----------   --------
             1 11 00 00    1011001
             1 01 10 01          1
             ----------
                1 01 11 remainder

Square root of 3
      1. 7  3  2  0  5
     ----------------------
 _  / 3.00 00 00 00 00
  \/  1 = 20×0×1+1^2
      -
      2 00
      1 89 = 20×1×7+7^2 (27 x 7)
      ----
        11 00
        10 29 = 20×17×3+3^2  (343 x 3)
        -----
           71 00
           69 24 = 20×173×2+2^2 (3462 x 2)
           -----
            1 76 00
                  0 = 20×1732×0+0^2 (34640 x 0)
            -------
            1 76 00 00
            1 73 20 25 = 20×17320×5+5^2 (346405 x 5)
            ----------
               2 79 75

Cube root of 5
      1.  7   0   9   9   7
     ----------------------
 _ 3/ 5. 000 000 000 000 000
  \/  1 = 300×(0^2)×1+30×0×(1^2)+1^3
      -
      4 000
      3 913 = 300×(1^2)×7+30×1×(7^2)+7^3
      -----
         87 000
              0 = 300×(17^2)×0+30×17×(0^2)+0^3
        -------
         87 000 000
         78 443 829 = 300×(170^2)×9+30×170×(9^2)+9^3
         ----------
          8 556 171 000
          7 889 992 299 = 300×(1709^2)×9+30×1709×(9^2)+9^3
          -------------
            666 178 701 000
            614 014 317 973 = 300×(17099^2)×7+30×17099×(7^2)+7^3
            ---------------
             52 164 383 027

Fourth root of 7
      1.   6    2    6    5    7
     ---------------------------
 _ 4/ 7.0000 0000 0000 0000 0000
  \/  1 = 4000×(0^3)×1+600×(0^2)×(1^2)+40×0×(1^3)+1^4
      -
      6 0000
      5 5536 = 4000×(1^3)×6+600×(1^2)×(6^2)+40×1×(6^3)+6^4
      ------
        4464 0000
        3338 7536 = 4000×(16^3)×2+600×(16^2)×(2^2)+40×16×(2^3)+2^4
        ---------
        1125 2464 0000
        1026 0494 3376 = 4000×(162^3)×6+600×(162^2)×(6^2)+40×162×(6^3)+6^4
        --------------
          99 1969 6624 0000
          86 0185 1379 0625 = 4000×(1626^3)×5+600×(1626^2)×(5^2)+
          -----------------   40×1626×(5^3)+5^4
          13 1784 5244 9375 0000
          12 0489 2414 6927 3201 = 4000×(16265^3)×7+600×(16265^2)×(7^2)+
          ----------------------   40×16265×(7^3)+7^4
           1 1295 2830 2447 6799

See also
 Methods of computing square roots
 nth root algorithm

External links
Why the square root algorithm works "Home School Math". Also related pages giving examples of the long-division-like pencil and paper method for square roots.
Reflections on The Square Root of Two "Medium". With an example of a C++ implementation.
Operations on numbers
Root-finding algorithms
Computer arithmetic algorithms
Digit-by-digit algorithms